Kevin Davids (born Kevin Davies) is a British actor and Paralympic fencing champion. He is best known for his role as Syd in the BBC television series I'm with Stupid. In 2003 he was one of the two supporting cast members in the short film Shotgun Dave Rides East, which starred Peter Capaldi and Tim Dantay as the two leads. In 2014, he appeared in Coronation Street as an important client of the Underworld factory.

Paralympic career
At the 1984 Summer Paralympics, Davies took gold in the wheelchair fencing sabre individual 4-5 event.

References

External links

BBC page about him

English male television actors
Living people
Place of birth missing (living people)
Year of birth missing (living people)
Paralympic gold medalists for Great Britain
Competitors at the 1984 Summer Paralympics
Medalists at the 1984 Summer Paralympics